Hesar-e Sofla or Hesar Sofla may refer to:
 Hesar-e Sofla, Tehran
 Hesar-e Sofla, West Azerbaijan
 Hesar-e Sofla, Zanjan